The 2011 Danish Cup Final was a football match that decided the winner of the 2010–11 Danish Cup. It was played on 22 May 2011 at 18:45 CEST, between FC Nordsjælland and FC Midtjylland, the same two teams who competed in last year's final, with FC Nordsjælland emerging victorious once again, 3–2.

Route to the final
As both teams had finished between 5th and 10th in the previous season's Superliga, both teams entered in the second round of the competition.

Pre-match
Traditionally, the Danish Cup Final is played on Ascension Day, a public holiday in Denmark, but the date 2 June was occupied by an international match date. Furthermore, the new match date of 22 May, set by the Danish FA and accepted by the Superliga clubs, coincided with the 2011 Copenhagen Marathon which meant that the area surrounding Parken was closed until 15:00, forcing the later starting time of 18:00.

For the first time in Danish Cup history, the same two teams were to play the final two years in a row, Nordsjælland beat Midtjylland 2–0 after extra time in last year's final.

Match
The match was originally scheduled for 18:00 CEST, but 30 minutes prior to kick-off the match was postponed 45 minutes because of a risk of lightning.

Match details
FC Nordsjælland was the designated home team for the match.

Statistics
Overall

References

Danish Cup Finals
Cup
Danish Cup Final 2011
Danish Cup Final 2011
Sports competitions in Copenhagen
2011 in Copenhagen
May 2011 sports events in Europe